This list of birds of Maine is a comprehensive listing of all the bird species recorded in the U.S. state of Maine. This list is published by the Maine Bird Records Committee (MBRC) and is dated August 2022.

This list contains 467 documented species, of which 138 are rare or accidental, five have been introduced and are established, and three are extinct. Two species were introduced but did not become established, two are regularly released, and ten are hypothetical as defined below. These 14 are not included in the 463 documented species.

This list is presented in the taxonomic sequence of the Check-list of North and Middle American Birds, 7th edition through the 62nd Supplement, published by the American Ornithological Society (AOS). Common and scientific names are also those of the Check-list, except that the common names of families are from the Clements taxonomy because the AOS list does not include them.

Unless otherwise noted, all species listed below are considered to occur regularly in Maine as permanent residents, summer or winter visitors, or migrants. The following tags are used to designate some species:

(R) Rare or accidental - birds that if seen require more comprehensive documentation than regularly seen species. These birds are considered rare or accidental in Maine.
(I) Introduced - a species introduced to North America by the actions of humans, either directly or indirectly
(E) Extinct - a recent species that no longer exists
(H) Hypothetical - species whose records "lack physical documentation, whether by specimen, photograph, or recording, or involve descriptions that are only partially adequate" per the MBRC
(FI) Failed introduced - species that "bred for some years in Maine but never became established" per the MBRC
(NE) Not established - species "routinely released or escaped...not established or known to be natural vagrants" per the MBRC

Ducks, geese, and waterfowl
Order: AnseriformesFamily: Anatidae

The family Anatidae includes the ducks and most duck-like waterfowl, such as geese and swans. These birds are adapted to an aquatic existence with webbed feet, bills which are flattened to a greater or lesser extent, and feathers that are excellent at shedding water due to special oils. Forty-seven species have been recorded in Maine.

Black-bellied whistling-duck, Dendrocygna autumnalis (R)
Fulvous whistling-duck, Dendrocygna bicolor (R)
Snow goose, Anser caerulescens
Ross's goose, Anser rossii (R)
Pink-footed goose, Anser brachyrhynchus (R)
Greater white-fronted goose, Anser albifrons
Brant, Branta bernicla
Barnacle goose, Branta leucopsis (R)
Cackling goose, Branta hutchinsii 
Canada goose, Branta canadensis 
Mute swan, Cygnus olor (I) 
Trumpeter swan, Cygnus buccinator (R)
Tundra swan, Cygnus columbianus (R)
Whooper swan, Cygnus cygnus (H)
Wood duck, Aix sponsa 
Garganey, Spatula querquedula (R)
Blue-winged teal, Spatula discors 
Northern shoveler, Spatula clypeata 
Gadwall, Mareca strepera 
Eurasian wigeon, Mareca penelope
American wigeon, Mareca americana 
Mallard, Anas platyrhynchos 
American black duck, Anas rubripes 
Northern pintail, Anas acuta 
Green-winged teal, Anas crecca 
Canvasback, Aythya valisineria
Redhead, Aythya americana
Ring-necked duck, Aythya collaris 
Tufted duck, Aythya fuligula (R)
Greater scaup, Aythya marila
Lesser scaup, Aythya affinis
Steller's eider, Polysticta stelleri (R)
King eider, Somateria spectabilis
Common eider, Somateria mollissima 
Harlequin duck, Histrionicus histrionicus
Labrador duck, Camptorhynchus labradorius (E) (H)
Surf scoter, Melanitta perspicillata
White-winged scoter, Melanitta deglandi
Black scoter, Melanitta americana
Long-tailed duck, Clangula hyemalis
Bufflehead, Bucephala albeola
Common goldeneye, Bucephala clangula
Barrow's goldeneye, Bucephala islandica
Hooded merganser, Lophodytes cucullatus 
Common merganser, Mergus merganser 
Red-breasted merganser, Mergus serrator 
Ruddy duck, Oxyura jamaicensis

New World quail
Order: GalliformesFamily: Odontophoridae

The New World quails are small, plump terrestrial birds only distantly related to the quails of the Old World, but named for their similar appearance and habits. One species has been recorded in Maine.

Northern bobwhite, Colinus virginianus (NE)

Pheasants, grouse, and allies
Order: GalliformesFamily: Phasianidae

Phasianidae consists of the pheasants and their allies. These are terrestrial species, variable in size but generally plump with broad relatively short wings. Many species are gamebirds or have been domesticated as a food source for humans. Turkeys have a distinctive fleshy wattle that hangs from the underside of the beak and a fleshy protuberance that hangs from the top of its beak called a snood. As with many galliform species, the female (the hen) is smaller than the male (the tom) and much less colorful. With wingspans of 1.5–1.8 meters (almost 6 feet), the turkeys are the largest birds in the open forests in which they live and are rarely mistaken for any other species. Grouse inhabit temperate and subarctic regions of the Northern Hemisphere. They are game and are sometimes hunted for food. Males are polygamous and have elaborate courtship displays. These heavily built birds have legs feathered to the toes. Most species are year-round residents and do not migrate. Eight species have been recorded in Maine.

Wild turkey, Meleagris gallopavo (extirpated, reintroduced)
Ruffed grouse, Bonasa umbellus 
Spruce grouse, Canachites canadensis 
Willow ptarmigan, Lagopus lagopus (R)
Greater prairie-chicken, Tympanuchus cupido (H)
Gray partridge, Perdix perdix (FI)
Ring-necked pheasant, Phasianus colchicus (I) 
Chukar, Alectoris chukar (NE)

Grebes
Order: PodicipediformesFamily: Podicipedidae

Grebes are small to medium-large freshwater diving birds. They have lobed toes and are excellent swimmers and divers. However, they have their feet placed far back on the body, making them quite ungainly on land. Six species have been recorded in Maine.

Pied-billed grebe, Podilymbus podiceps
Horned grebe, Podiceps auritus
Red-necked grebe, Podiceps grisegena
Eared grebe, Podiceps nigricollis (R)
Western grebe, Aechmorphorus occidentalis (R)
Clark's grebe, Aechmorphorus clarkii (R)

Pigeons and doves
Order: ColumbiformesFamily: Columbidae

Pigeons and doves are stout-bodied birds with short necks and short slender bills with a fleshy cere. Six species have been recorded in Maine.

Rock pigeon, Columba livia (I) 
Band-tailed pigeon, Patagioenas fasciata (R)
Eurasian collared-dove, Streptopelia decaocto (I) (R)
Passenger pigeon, Ectopistes migratorius (E)
White-winged dove, Zenaida asiatica
Mourning dove, Zenaida macroura

Cuckoos
Order: CuculiformesFamily: Cuculidae

The family Cuculidae includes cuckoos, roadrunners, and anis. These birds are of variable size with slender bodies, long tails, and strong legs. Two species have been recorded in Maine.

Yellow-billed cuckoo, Coccyzus americanus 
Black-billed cuckoo, Coccyzus erythropthalmus

Nightjars and allies
Order: CaprimulgiformesFamily: Caprimulgidae

Nightjars are medium-sized nocturnal birds that usually nest on the ground. They have long wings, short legs, and very short bills. Most have small feet, of little use for walking, and long pointed wings. Their soft plumage is cryptically colored to resemble bark or leaves. Three species have been recorded in Maine.

Common nighthawk, Chordeiles minor
Chuck-will's-widow, Antrostomus carolinensis (R)
Eastern whip-poor-will, Antrostomus vociferus

Swifts
Order: ApodiformesFamily: Apodidae

The swifts are small birds which spend the majority of their lives flying. These birds have very short legs and never settle voluntarily on the ground, perching instead only on vertical surfaces. Many swifts have long swept-back wings which resemble a crescent or boomerang. One species has been recorded in Maine.

Chimney swift, Chaetura pelagica

Hummingbirds

Order: ApodiformesFamily: Trochilidae

Hummingbirds are small birds capable of hovering in mid-air due to the rapid flapping of their wings. They are the only birds that can fly backwards. Four species have been recorded in Maine.

Mexican violetear, Colibri thalassinus (R)
Ruby-throated hummingbird, Archilochus colubris 
Calliope hummingbird, Selasphorus calliope (R)
Rufous hummingbird, Selasphorus rufus (R)

Rails, gallinules, and coots

Order: GruiformesFamily: Rallidae

Rallidae is a large family of small to medium-sized birds which includes the rails, crakes, coots, and gallinules. The most typical family members occupy dense vegetation in damp environments near lakes, swamps, or rivers. In general they are shy and secretive birds, making them difficult to observe. Most species have strong legs and long toes which are well adapted to soft uneven surfaces. They tend to have short, rounded wings and to be weak fliers. Nine species have been recorded in Maine.

Clapper rail, Rallus crepitans (R)
King rail, Rallus elegans (R)
Virginia rail, Rallus limicola
Sora, Porzana carolina
Common gallinule, Gallinula galeata
American coot, Fulica americana
Purple gallinule, Porphyrio martinicus
Yellow rail, Coturnicops noveboracensis (R)
Corn crake, Crex crex (R)

Cranes
Order: GruiformesFamily: Gruidae

Cranes are large, long-legged, and long-necked birds. Unlike the similar-looking but unrelated herons, cranes fly with necks outstretched, not pulled back. Most have elaborate and noisy courting displays or "dances". One species has been recorded in Maine.

Sandhill crane, Antigone canadensis

Stilts and avocets
Order: CharadriiformesFamily: Recurvirostridae

Recurvirostridae is a family of large wading birds which includes the avocets and stilts. The avocets have long legs and long up-curved bills. The stilts have extremely long legs and long, thin, straight bills. Two species have been recorded in Maine.

Black-necked stilt, Himantopus mexicanus (R)
American avocet, Recurvirostra americana

Oystercatchers
Order: CharadriiformesFamily: Haematopodidae

The oystercatchers are large, obvious, and noisy plover-like birds, with strong bills used for smashing or prising open molluscs. One species has been recorded in Maine.

American oystercatcher, Haematopus palliatus

Plovers and lapwings
Order: CharadriiformesFamily: Charadriidae

The family Charadriidae includes the plovers, dotterels, and lapwings. They are small to medium-sized birds with compact bodies, short thick necks, and long, usually pointed, wings. They are found in open country worldwide, mostly in habitats near water. Eleven species have been recorded in Maine.

Northern lapwing, Vanellus vanellus (R)
Black-bellied plover, Pluvialis squatarola
European golden-plover, Pluvialis apricaria (R)
American golden-plover, Pluvialis dominica
Pacific golden-plover, Pluvialis fulva (R)
Killdeer, Charadrius vociferus
Common ringed plover, Charadrius hiaticula (R)
Semipalmated plover, Charadrius semipalmatus
Piping plover, Charadrius melodus 
Wilson's plover, Charadrius wilsonia (R)
Snowy plover, Charadrius nivosus (R)

Sandpipers and allies

Order: CharadriiformesFamily: Scolopacidae

Scolopacidae is a large diverse family of small to medium-sized shorebirds including the sandpipers, curlews, godwits, shanks, tattlers, woodcocks, snipes, dowitchers, and phalaropes. The majority of these species eat small invertebrates picked out of the mud or soil. Different lengths of legs and bills enable multiple species to feed in the same habitat, particularly on the coast, without direct competition for food. Thirty-eight species have been recorded in Maine.

Upland sandpiper, Bartramia longicauda 
Whimbrel, Numenius phaeopus
Eskimo curlew, Numenius borealis (E)
Long-billed curlew, Numenius americanus (R)
Bar-tailed godwit, Limosa lapponica (R)
Hudsonian godwit, Limosa haemastica
Marbled godwit, Limosa fedoa
Ruddy turnstone, Arenaria interpres
Great knot, Calidris tenuirostris (R)
Red knot, Calidris canutus
Surfbird, Calidris virgata (R)
Ruff, Calidris pugnax (R)
Stilt sandpiper, Calidris himantopus
Curlew sandpiper, Calidris ferruginea (R)
Red-necked stint, Calidris ruficollis (R)
Sanderling, Calidris alba
Dunlin, Calidris alpina
Purple sandpiper, Calidris maritima
Baird's sandpiper, Calidris bairdii
Least sandpiper, Calidris minutilla
White-rumped sandpiper, Calidris fuscicollis
Buff-breasted sandpiper, Calidris subruficollis
Pectoral sandpiper, Calidris melanotos
Semipalmated sandpiper, Calidris pusilla
Western sandpiper, Calidris mauri
Short-billed dowitcher, Limnodromus griseus
Long-billed dowitcher, Limnodromus scolopaceus
American woodcock, Scolopax minor 
Wilson's snipe, Gallinago delicata 
Spotted sandpiper, Actitis macularia 
Solitary sandpiper, Tringa solitaria
Gray-tailed tattler, Tringa brevipes (R)
Lesser yellowlegs, Tringa flavipes
Willet, Tringa semipalmata 
Greater yellowlegs, Tringa melanoleuca
Wilson's phalarope, Phalaropus tricolor 
Red-necked phalarope, Phalaropus lobatus
Red phalarope, Phalaropus fulicarius

Skuas and jaegers
Order: CharadriiformesFamily: Stercorariidae

They are in general medium to large birds, typically with gray or brown plumage, often with white markings on the wings. They have longish bills with hooked tips and webbed feet with sharp claws. They look like large dark gulls, but have a fleshy cere above the upper mandible. They are strong, acrobatic fliers. Five species have been recorded in Maine.

Great skua, Stercorarius skua
South polar skua, Stercorarius maccormicki
Pomarine jaeger, Stercorarius pomarinus
Parasitic jaeger, Stercorarius parasiticus
Long-tailed jaeger, Stercorarius longicaudus (R)

Auks, murres, and puffins
Order: CharadriiformesFamily: Alcidae

Alcids are superficially similar to penguins due to their black-and-white colors, their upright posture, and some of their habits. However, they are only distantly related to the penguins and are able to fly. Auks live on the open sea, only deliberately coming ashore to nest. Nine species have been recorded in Maine.

Dovekie, Alle alle
Common murre, Uria aalge 
Thick-billed murre, Uria lomvia
Razorbill, Alca torda 
Great auk, Pinguinus impennis (E)
Black guillemot, Cepphus grylle
Ancient murrelet, Synthliboramphus antiquus (R)
Atlantic puffin, Fratercula arctica 
Tufted puffin, Fratercula cirrhata (R)

Gulls, terns, and skimmers
Order: CharadriiformesFamily: Laridae

Laridae is a family of medium to large seabirds and includes gulls, terns, kittiwakes, and skimmers. They are typically gray or white, often with black markings on the head or wings. They have longish bills and webbed feet. Thirty species have been recorded in Maine.

Black-legged kittiwake, Rissa tridactyla
Ivory gull, Pagophila eburnea (R)
Sabine's gull, Xema sabini
Bonaparte's gull, Chroicocephalus philadelphia
Black-headed gull, Chroicocephalus ridibundus
Little gull, Hydrocoleus minutus
Laughing gull, Leucophaeus atricilla 
Franklin's gull, Leucophaeus pipixcan (R)
Common gull, Larus canus (R)
Short-billed gull, Larus brachyrhynchus (R)
Ring-billed gull, Larus delawarensis 
Herring gull, Larus argentatus 
Iceland gull, Larus glaucoides
Lesser black-backed gull, Larus fuscus
Slaty-backed gull, Larus schistisagus (R)
Glaucous gull, Larus hyperboreus
Great black-backed gull, Larus marinus 
Sooty tern, Onychoprion fuscata (R)
Bridled tern, Onychoprion anaethetus (R)
Least tern, Sternula antillarum 
Gull-billed tern, Gelochelidon nilotica (R)
Caspian tern, Hydroprogne caspia
Black tern, Chlidonias niger 
White-winged tern, Chlidonias leucopterus (R)
Roseate tern, Sterna dougallii 
Common tern, Sterna hirundo 
Arctic tern, Sterna paradisaea
Forster's tern, Sterna forsteri 
Royal tern, Thalasseus maxima
Sandwich tern, Thalasseus sandvicensis (R)
Black skimmer, Rynchops niger

Tropicbirds
Order: PhaethontiformesFamily: Phaethontidae

Tropicbirds are slender white birds of tropical oceans with exceptionally long central tail feathers. Their long wings have black markings, as does the head. Two species have been recorded in Maine.

White-tailed tropicbird, Phaethon lepturus (R)
Red-billed tropicbird, Phaethon aethereus (R)

Loons

Order: GaviiformesFamily: Gaviidae

Loons are aquatic birds, the size of a large duck, to which they are unrelated. Their plumage is largely gray or black, and they have spear-shaped bills. Loons swim well and fly adequately, but are almost hopeless on land, because their legs are placed towards the rear of the body. Four species have been recorded in Maine.

Red-throated loon, Gavia stellata
Pacific loon, Gavia pacifica (R)
Common loon, Gavia immer
Yellow-billed loon, Gavia adamsii (R)

Albatrosses
Order: ProcellariiformesFamily: Diomedeidae

The albatrosses are amongst the largest of flying birds, and the great albatrosses from the genus Diomedea have the largest wingspans of any extant birds. Two species have been recorded in Maine.

Yellow-nosed albatross, Thalassarche chlororhynchos (R)
Black-browed albatross, Thalassarche melanophris (R)

Southern storm-petrels

Order: ProcellariiformesFamily: Oceanitidae

The storm-petrels are the smallest seabirds, relatives of the petrels, feeding on planktonic crustaceans and small fish picked from the surface, typically while hovering. The flight is fluttering and sometimes bat-like. Until 2018, this family's three species were included with the other storm-petrels in family Hydrobatidae. One species has been recorded in Maine

Wilson's storm-petrel, Oceanites oceanicus

Northern storm-petrels
Order: ProcellariiformesFamily: Hydrobatidae

Though the members of this family are similar in many respects to the southern storm-petrels, including their general appearance and habits, there are enough genetic differences to warrant their placement in a separate family. Two species have been recorded in Maine.

Leach's storm-petrel, Hydrobates leucorhous 
Band-rumped storm-petrel, Hydrobates castro (H)

Shearwaters and petrels

Order: ProcellariiformesFamily: Procellariidae

The Procellariids are the main group of medium-sized "true petrels", characterized by united nostrils with medium septum and a long outer functional primary. Nine species have been recorded in Maine.

Northern fulmar, Fulmarus glacialis
Cape petrel, Daption capense (H)
Trindade petrel, Pterodroma arminjoniana (R)
White-chinned petrel, Procellaria aequinoctialis (R)
Cory's shearwater, Calonectris diomedea
Sooty shearwater, Ardenna griseus
Great shearwater, Ardenna gravis
Manx shearwater, Puffinus puffinus
Barolo shearwater, Puffinus baroli (R)
Audubon's shearwater, Puffinus lherminieri (H)

Storks
Order: CiconiiformesFamily: Ciconiidae

Storks are large, heavy, long-legged, long-necked wading birds with long stout bills and wide wingspans. They lack the powder down that other wading birds such as herons, spoonbills, and ibises use to clean off fish slime. Storks lack a pharynx and are mute. One species has been recorded in Maine.

Wood stork, Mycteria americana (R)

Frigatebirds
Order: SuliformesFamily: Fregatidae

Frigatebirds are large seabirds usually found over tropical oceans. They are large, black, or black-and-white, with long wings and deeply forked tails. The males have colored inflatable throat pouches. They do not swim or walk and cannot take off from a flat surface. Having the largest wingspan-to-body-weight ratio of any bird, they are essentially aerial, able to stay aloft for more than a week. Two species have been recorded in Maine.

Lesser frigatebird, Fregata ariel (R)
Magnificent frigatebird, Fregata magnificens (R)

Boobies and gannets
Order: SuliformesFamily: Sulidae

The sulids comprise the gannets and boobies. Both groups are medium-large coastal seabirds that plunge-dive for fish. Two species have been recorded in Maine.

Brown booby, Sula leucogaster (R)
Masked booby, Sula dactylatra (R)
Northern gannet, Morus bassanus

Cormorants and shags
Order: SuliformesFamily: Phalacrocoracidae

Cormorants are medium-to-large aquatic birds, usually with mainly dark plumage and areas of colored skin on the face. The bill is long, thin, and sharply hooked. Their feet are four-toed and webbed. Two species have been recorded in Maine.

Great cormorant, Phalacrocorax carbo
Double-crested cormorant, Nannopterum auritum

Pelicans
Order: PelecaniformesFamily: Pelecanidae

Pelicans are very large water birds with a distinctive pouch under their beak. Like other birds in the order Pelecaniformes, they have four webbed toes. Two species have been recorded in Maine.

American white pelican, Pelecanus erythrorhynchos
Brown pelican, Pelecanus occidentalis (R)

Herons, egrets, and bitterns

Order: PelecaniformesFamily: Ardeidae

The family Ardeidae contains the herons, egrets, and bitterns. Herons and egrets are medium to large wading birds with long necks and legs. Bitterns tend to be shorter necked and more secretive. Members of Ardeidae fly with their necks retracted, unlike other long-necked birds such as storks, ibises, and spoonbills. Thirteen species have been recorded in Maine.

American bittern, Botaurus lentiginosus 
Least bittern, Ixobrychus exilis 
Great blue heron, Ardea herodias 
Great egret, Ardea alba 
Little egret, Egretta garzetta (R)
Western reef-heron, Egretta gularis (R)
Snowy egret, Egretta thula 
Little blue heron, Egretta caerulea 
Tricolored heron, Egretta tricolor 
Cattle egret, Bubulcus ibis 
Green heron, Butorides virescens 
Black-crowned night-heron, Nycticorax nycticorax 
Yellow-crowned night-heron, Nyctanassa violacea

Ibises and spoonbills
Order: PelecaniformesFamily: Threskiornithidae

The family Threskiornithidae includes the ibises and spoonbills. They have long, broad wings. Their bodies tend to be elongated, the neck more so, with rather long legs. The bill is also long, decurved in the case of the ibises, straight and distinctively flattened in the spoonbills. Four species have been recorded in Maine.

White ibis, Eudocimus albus (R)
Glossy ibis, Plegadis falcinellus
White-faced ibis, Plegadis chihi (R if outside York and Cumberland Counties)
Roseate spoonbill, Platalea ajaja (R)

New World vultures
Order: CathartiformesFamily: Cathartidae

The New World vultures are not closely related to Old World vultures, but superficially resemble them because of convergent evolution. Like the Old World vultures, they are scavengers. However, unlike Old World vultures, which find carcasses by sight, New World vultures have a good sense of smell with which they locate carcasses. Two species have been recorded in Maine.

Black vulture, Coragyps atratus
Turkey vulture, Cathartes aura

Osprey
Order: AccipitriformesFamily: Pandionidae

Pandionidae is a family of fish-eating birds of prey possessing a very large, powerful hooked beak for tearing flesh from their prey, strong legs, powerful talons, and keen eyesight. The family is monotypic.

Osprey, Pandion haliaetus

Hawks, eagles, and kites

Order: AccipitriformesFamily: Accipitridae

Accipitridae is a family of birds of prey which includes hawks, eagles, kites, harriers, and Old World vultures. These birds have very large powerful hooked beaks for tearing flesh from their prey, strong legs, powerful talons, and keen eyesight. Fifteen species have been recorded in Maine.

Swallow-tailed kite, Elanoides forficatus (R)
Golden eagle, Aquila chrysaetos
Northern harrier, Circus hudsonius 
Sharp-shinned hawk, Accipiter striatus 
Cooper's hawk, Accipiter cooperii 
Northern goshawk, Accipiter gentilis 
Bald eagle, Haliaeetus leucocephalus 
Mississippi kite, Ictinia mississippiensis (R)
Great black hawk, Buteogallus urubitinga (R)
Red-shouldered hawk, Buteo lineatus 
Broad-winged hawk, Buteo platypterus 
Swainson's hawk, Buteo swainsoni (R)
Zone-tailed hawk, Buteo albonotatus (R)
Red-tailed hawk, Buteo jamaicensis 
Rough-legged hawk, Buteo lagopus

Barn-owls
Order: StrigiformesFamily: Tytonidae

Barn-owls are medium to large owls with large heads and characteristic heart-shaped faces. They have long strong legs with powerful talons. One species has been recorded in Maine.

Barn-owl, Tyto alba (R)

Owls

Order: StrigiformesFamily: Strigidae

Typical owls are small to large solitary nocturnal birds of prey. They have large forward-facing eyes and ears, a hawk-like beak, and a conspicuous circle of feathers around each eye called a facial disk. Eleven species have been recorded in Maine.

Eastern screech-owl, Megascops asio  (R except in York County)
Great horned owl, Bubo virginianus 
Snowy owl, Bubo scandiacus
Northern hawk owl, Surnia ulula
Burrowing owl, Athene cunicularia (R)
Barred owl, Strix varia 
Great gray owl, Strix nebulosa
Long-eared owl, Asio otus 
Short-eared owl, Asio flammeus 
Boreal owl, Aegolius funereus (R)
Northern saw-whet owl, Aegolius acadicus

Kingfishers
Order: CoraciiformesFamily: Alcedinidae

Kingfishers are medium-sized birds with large heads, long pointed bills, short legs, and stubby tails. One species has been recorded in Maine.

Belted kingfisher, Megaceryle alcyon

Woodpeckers
Order: PiciformesFamily: Picidae

Woodpeckers are small to medium-sized birds with chisel-like beaks, short legs, stiff tails, and long tongues used for capturing insects. Some species have feet with two toes pointing forward and two backward, while several species have only three toes. Many woodpeckers have the habit of tapping noisily on tree trunks with their beaks. Nine species have been recorded in Maine.

Red-headed woodpecker, Melanerpes erythrocephalus 
Red-bellied woodpecker, Melanerpes carolinus 
Yellow-bellied sapsucker, Sphyrapicus varius 
American three-toed woodpecker, Picoides dorsalis 
Black-backed woodpecker, Picoides arcticus 
Downy woodpecker, Dryobates pubescens 
Hairy woodpecker, Dryobates villosus 
Northern flicker, Colaptes auratus 
Pileated woodpecker, Dryocopus pileatus

Falcons and caracaras
Order: FalconiformesFamily: Falconidae

Falconidae is a family of diurnal birds of prey, notably the falcons and caracaras. They differ from hawks, eagles, and kites in that they kill with their beaks instead of their talons. Five species have been recorded in Maine.

Crested caracara, Caracara plancus (R)
American kestrel, Falco sparverius 
Merlin, Falco columbarius
Gyrfalcon, Falco rusticolus (R)
Peregrine falcon, Falco peregrinus

New World and African parrots
Order: PsittaciformesFamily: Psittacidae

Parrots are small to large birds with a characteristic curved beak. Their upper mandibles have slight mobility in the joint with the skull and they have a generally erect stance. All parrots are zygodactyl, having the four toes on each foot placed two at the front and two to the back. Most of the more than 150 species in this family are found in the New World. One species has been recorded in Maine.

Monk parakeet, Myiopsitta monachus (I) (FI)

Tyrant flycatchers

Order: PasseriformesFamily: Tyrannidae

Tyrant flycatchers are Passerine birds which occur throughout North and South America. They superficially resemble the Old World flycatchers, but are more robust and have stronger bills. They do not have the sophisticated vocal capabilities of the songbirds. Most, but not all, are rather plain. As the name implies, most are insectivorous. Twenty-one species have been recorded in Maine.

Ash-throated flycatcher, Myiarchus cinerascens (R)
Great crested flycatcher, Myiarchus crinitus 
Variegated flycatcher, Empidonomus varius (R)
Tropical kingbird, Tyrannus melancholicus (R)
Western kingbird, Tyrannus verticalis
Eastern kingbird, Tyrannus tyrannus 
Gray kingbird, Tyrannus dominicensis (R)
Scissor-tailed flycatcher, Tyrannus forficatus
Fork-tailed flycatcher, Tyrannus savana (R)
Olive-sided flycatcher, Contopus cooperi 
Western wood-pewee, Contopus sordidulus (R)
Eastern wood-pewee, Contopus virens 
Yellow-bellied flycatcher, Empidonax flaviventris 
Acadian flycatcher, Empidonax virescens (R)
Alder flycatcher, Empidonax alnorum 
Willow flycatcher, Empidonax traillii 
Least flycatcher, Empidonax minimus 
Gray flycatcher, Empidonax wrightii (R)
Eastern phoebe, Sayornis phoebe 
Say's phoebe, Sayornis saya (R)
Vermilion flycatcher, Pyrocephalus rubinus (R)

Vireos, shrike-babblers, and erpornis
Order: PasseriformesFamily: Vireonidae

The vireos are a group of small to medium-sized passerine birds. They are typically greenish in color and resemble wood warblers apart from their heavier bills. Nine species have been recorded in Maine.

White-eyed vireo, Vireo griseus
Bell's vireo, Vireo bellii (R)
Yellow-throated vireo, Vireo flavifrons 
Cassin's vireo, Vireo cassinii (R)
Blue-headed vireo, Vireo solitarius 
Plumbeous vireo, Vireo plumbeus (R)
Philadelphia vireo, Vireo philadelphicus 
Warbling vireo, Vireo gilvus 
Red-eyed vireo, Vireo olivaceus

Shrikes
Order: PasseriformesFamily: Laniidae

Shrikes are passerine birds known for their habit of catching other birds and small animals and impaling the uneaten portions of their bodies on thorns. A shrike's beak is hooked, like that of a typical bird of prey. Two species have been recorded in Maine.

Loggerhead shrike, Lanius ludovicianus (R) extirpated
Northern shrike, Lanius borealis

Crows, jays, and magpies

Order: PasseriformesFamily: Corvidae

The family Corvidae includes crows, ravens, jays, choughs, magpies, treepies, nutcrackers, and ground jays. Corvids are above average in size among the Passeriformes, and some of the larger species show high levels of intelligence. Seven species have been recorded in Maine.

Canada jay, Perisoreus canadensis 
Blue jay, Cyanocitta cristata 
Black-billed magpie, Pica hudsonia (H)
Eurasian jackdaw, Coloeus monedula (H)
American crow, Corvus brachyrhynchos 
Fish crow, Corvus ossifragus 
Common raven, Corvus corax

Tits, chickadees, and titmice
Order: PasseriformesFamily: Paridae

The Paridae are mainly small stocky woodland species with short stout bills. Some have crests. They are adaptable birds, with a mixed diet including seeds and insects. Three species have been recorded in Maine.

Black-capped chickadee, Poecile atricapilla
Boreal chickadee, Poecile hudsonica
Tufted titmouse, Baeolophus bicolor

Larks
Order: PasseriformesFamily: Alaudidae

Larks are small terrestrial birds with often extravagant songs and display flights. Most larks are fairly dull in appearance. Their food is insects and seeds. One species has been recorded in Maine.

Horned lark, Eremophila alpestris

Swallows
Order: PasseriformesFamily: Hirundinidae

The family Hirundinidae is adapted to aerial feeding. They have a slender streamlined body, long pointed wings, and a short bill with a wide gape. The feet are adapted to perching rather than walking, and the front toes are partially joined at the base. Seven species have been recorded in Maine.

Bank swallow, Riparia riparia 
Tree swallow, Tachycineta bicolor 
Violet-green swallow, Tachycineta thalassina (R)
Northern rough-winged swallow, Stelgidopteryx serripennis 
Purple martin, Progne subis 
Barn swallow, Hirundo rustica
Cliff swallow, Petrochelidon pyrrhonota 
Cave swallow, Petrochelidon fulva (R)

Kinglets
Order: PasseriformesFamily: Regulidae

The kinglets are a small family of birds which resemble the titmice. They are very small insectivorous birds. The adults have colored crowns, giving rise to their name. Two species have been recorded in Maine.

Ruby-crowned kinglet, Corthylio calendula
Golden-crowned kinglet, Regulus satrapa

Waxwings
Order: PasseriformesFamily: Bombycillidae

The waxwings are a group of birds with soft silky plumage and unique red tips to some of the wing feathers. In the Bohemian and cedar waxwings, these tips look like sealing wax and give the group its name. These are arboreal birds of northern forests. They live on insects in summer and berries in winter. Two species have been recorded in Maine.

Bohemian waxwing, Bombycilla garrulus
Cedar waxwing, Bombycilla cedrorum

Nuthatches
Order: PasseriformesFamily: Sittidae

Nuthatches are small woodland birds. They have the unusual ability to climb down trees head first, unlike other birds which can only go upwards. Nuthatches have big heads, short tails, and powerful bills and feet. Two species have been recorded in Maine.

Red-breasted nuthatch, Sitta canadensis)
White-breasted nuthatch, Sitta carolinensis

Treecreepers
Order: PasseriformesFamily: Certhiidae

Treecreepers are small woodland birds, brown above and white below. They have thin pointed down-curved bills which they use to extricate insects from bark. They have stiff tail feathers, like woodpeckers, which they use to support themselves on vertical trees. One species has been recorded in Maine.

Brown creeper, Certhia americana

Gnatcatchers
Order: PasseriformesFamily: Polioptilidae

These dainty birds resemble Old World warblers in their structure and habits, moving restlessly through the foliage seeking insects. The gnatcatchers are mainly soft bluish gray in color and have the typical insectivore's long sharp bill. Many species have distinctive black head patterns (especially males) and long, regularly cocked, black-and-white tails. One species has been recorded in Maine.

Blue-gray gnatcatcher, Polioptila caerulea

Wrens
Order: PasseriformesFamily: Troglodytidae

Wrens are small and inconspicuous birds, except for their loud songs. They have short wings and thin down-turned bills. Several species often hold their tails upright. All are insectivorous. Seven species have been recorded in Maine.

Rock wren, Salpinctes obsoletus (R)
House wren, Troglodytes aedon 
Winter wren, Troglodytes hiemalis 
Sedge wren, Cistothorus platensis  (R)
Marsh wren, Cistothorus palustris 
Carolina wren, Thryothorus ludovicianus 
Bewick's wren, Thryomanes bewickii (H)

Mockingbirds and thrashers
Order: PasseriformesFamily: Mimidae

The mimids are a family of passerine birds which includes thrashers, mockingbirds, tremblers, and the New World catbirds. These birds are notable for their vocalization, especially their remarkable ability to mimic a wide variety of birds and other sounds heard outdoors. The species tend towards dull grays and browns in their appearance. Four species have been recorded in Maine.

Gray catbird, Dumetella carolinensis 
Brown thrasher, Toxostoma rufum 
Sage thrasher, Oreoscoptes montanus (R)
Northern mockingbird, Mimus polyglottos

Starlings
Order: PasseriformesFamily: Sturnidae

Starlings are small to medium-sized Old World passerine birds with strong feet. Their flight is strong and direct and most are very gregarious. Their preferred habitat is fairly open country, and they eat insects and fruit. The plumage of several species is dark with a metallic sheen. One species has been recorded in Maine.

European starling, Sturnus vulgaris (I)

Thrushes and allies

Order: PasseriformesFamily: Turdidae

The thrushes are a group of passerine birds that occur mainly but not exclusively in the Old World. They are plump, soft plumaged, small to medium-sized insectivores or sometimes omnivores, often feeding on the ground. Many have attractive songs. Thirteen species have been recorded in Maine.

Eastern bluebird, Sialia sialis 
Mountain bluebird, Sialia currucoides (R)
Townsend's solitaire, Myadestes townsendi
Veery, Catharus fuscescens 
Gray-cheeked thrush, Catharus minimus
Bicknell's thrush, Catharus bicknelli 
Swainson's thrush, Catharus ustulatus 
Hermit thrush, Catharus guttatus 
Wood thrush, Hylocichla mustelina 
Redwing, Turdus iliacus (R)
Fieldfare, Turdus pilaris (R)
American robin, Turdus migratorius 
Varied thrush, Ixoreus naevius

Old World flycatchers
Order: PasseriformesFamily: Muscicapidae

The Old World flycatchers are a large family of small passerine birds mostly restricted to the Old World. These are mainly small arboreal insectivores, many of which, as the name implies, take their prey on the wing. One species has been recorded in Maine.

Northern wheatear, Oenanthe oenanthe (R)

Old World sparrows
Order: PasseriformesFamily: Passeridae

Old World sparrows are small passerine birds. In general, sparrows tend to be small plump brownish or grayish birds with short tails and short powerful beaks. Sparrows are seed eaters, but they also consume small insects. One species has been recorded in Maine.

House sparrow, Passer domesticus (I)

Wagtails and pipits
Order: PasseriformesFamily: Motacillidae

Motacillidae is a family of small passerine birds with medium to long tails. They include the wagtails, longclaws, and pipits. They are slender, ground-feeding insectivores of open country. One species has been recorded in Maine.

American pipit, Anthus rubescens

Finches, euphonias, and allies

Order: PasseriformesFamily: Fringillidae

Finches are seed-eating passerine birds that are small to moderately large and have a strong beak, usually conical and in some species very large. All have twelve tail feathers and nine primaries. These birds have a bouncing flight with alternating bouts of flapping and gliding on closed wings, and most sing well. Fifteen species have been recorded in Maine.

Common chaffinch, Fringilla coelebs (R)
Evening grosbeak, Coccothraustes vespertinus
Pine grosbeak, Pinicola enucleator 
Gray-crowned rosy-finch, Leucosticte tephrocotis (R)
House finch, Haemorhous mexicanus (Native to the southwestern U.S.; introduced in the east)
Purple finch, Haemorhous purpureus 
Common redpoll, Acanthis flammea
Hoary redpoll, Acanthis hornemanni
Red crossbill, Loxia curvirostra 
White-winged crossbill, Loxia leucoptera 
Eurasian siskin, Spinus spinus (R)
Pine siskin, Spinus pinus 
Lesser goldfinch, Spinus psaltria (R)
American goldfinch, Spinus tristis

Longspurs and snow buntings
Order: PasseriformesFamily: Calcariidae

The Calcariidae are a group of passerine birds that have been traditionally grouped with the New World sparrows, but differ in a number of respects and are usually found in open grassy areas. Four species have been recorded in Maine.

Lapland longspur, Calcarius lapponicus
Chestnut-collared longspur, Calcarius ornatus (R)
Smith's longspur, Calcarius pictus (R)
Snow bunting, Plectrophenax nivalis

New World sparrows
Order: PasseriformesFamily: Passerellidae

Until 2017, these species were considered part of the family Emberizidae. Most of the species are known as sparrows, but these birds are not closely related to the Old World sparrows which are in the family Passeridae. Many of these have distinctive head patterns.

Cassin's sparrow, Peucaea cassinii (R)
Grasshopper sparrow, Ammodramus savannarum 
Black-throated sparrow, Amphispiza bilineata (R)
Lark sparrow, Chondestes grammacus
Lark bunting, Calamospiza melanocorys (R)
Chipping sparrow, Spizella passerina 
Clay-colored sparrow, Spizella pallida
Field sparrow, Spizella pusilla 
Brewer's sparrow, Spizella breweri (R)
Fox sparrow, Passerella iliaca 
American tree sparrow, Spizelloides arborea
Dark-eyed junco, Junco hyemalis
White-crowned sparrow, Zonotrichia leucophrys
Golden-crowned sparrow, Zonotrichia atricapilla (R)
Harris's sparrow, Zonotrichia querula (R)
White-throated sparrow, Zonotrichia albicollis 
Vesper sparrow, Pooecetes gramineus 
LeConte's sparrow, Ammospiza leconteii (R)
Seaside sparrow, Ammospiza maritima 
Nelson's sparrow, Ammospiza nelsoni 
Saltmarsh sparrow, Ammospiza caudacuta 
Henslow's sparrow, Centronyx henslowii (R)
Savannah sparrow, Passerculus sandwichensis 
Song sparrow, Melospiza melodia 
Lincoln's sparrow, Melospiza lincolnii 
Swamp sparrow, Melospiza georgiana 
Green-tailed towhee, Pipilo chlorurus (R)
Eastern towhee, Pipilo erythrophthalmus

Yellow-breasted chat
Order: PasseriformesFamily: Icteriidae

This species was historically placed in the wood-warblers (Parulidae) but nonetheless most authorities were unsure if it belonged there. It was placed in its own family in 2017.

Yellow-breasted chat, Icteria virens

Troupials and allies
Order: PasseriformesFamily: Icteridae

The icterids are a group of small to medium-sized, often colorful passerine birds restricted to the New World and include the grackles, New World blackbirds, and New World orioles. Most species have black as a predominant plumage color, often enlivened by yellow, orange, or red. Fifteen species have been recorded in Maine.

Yellow-headed blackbird, Xanthocephalus xanthocephalus
Bobolink, Dolichonyx oryzivorus 
Eastern meadowlark, Sturnella magna 
Western meadowlark, Sturnella neglecta (R)
Orchard oriole, Icterus spurius 
Bullock's oriole, Icterus bullockii (R)
Baltimore oriole, Icterus galbula
Red-winged blackbird, Agelaius phoeniceus 
Shiny cowbird, Molothrus bonariensis (R)
Bronzed cowbird, Molothrus aeneus (R)
Brown-headed cowbird, Molothrus ater 
Rusty blackbird, Euphagus carolinus 
Brewer's blackbird, Euphagus cyanocephalus (R)
Common grackle, Quiscalus quiscula 
Boat-tailed grackle, Quiscalus major (H)

New World warblers

Order: PasseriformesFamily: Parulidae

The wood-warblers are a group of small often colorful passerine birds restricted to the New World. Most are arboreal, but some are more terrestrial. Most members of this family are insectivores. Forty-two species have been recorded in Maine.

Ovenbird, Seiurus aurocapilla
Worm-eating warbler, Helmitheros vermivorum
Louisiana waterthrush, Parkesia motacilla
Northern waterthrush, Parkesia noveboracensis
Golden-winged warbler, Vermivora chrysoptera (R)
Blue-winged warbler, Vermivora cyanoptera
Black-and-white warbler, Mniotilta varia
Prothonotary warbler, Protonotaria citrea
Swainson's warbler, Limnothlypis swainsonii (R)
Tennessee warbler, Leiothlypis peregrina
Orange-crowned warbler, Leiothlypis celata
Nashville warbler, Leiothlypis ruficapilla
Virginia's warbler, Leiothlypis virginiae (R)
Connecticut warbler, Oporornis agilis
MacGillivray's warbler, Geothlypis tolmiei (R)
Mourning warbler, Geothlypis philadelphia
Kentucky warbler, Geothlypis formosa (R)
Common yellowthroat, Geothlypis trichas
Hooded warbler, Setophaga citrina
American redstart, Setophaga ruticilla
Kirtland's warbler, Setophaga kirtlandii (R)
Cape May warbler, Setophaga tigrina
Cerulean warbler, Setophaga cerulea (R)
Northern parula, Setophaga americana
Magnolia warbler, Setophaga magnolia
Bay-breasted warbler, Setophaga castanea
Blackburnian warbler, Setophaga fusca
Yellow warbler, Setophaga petechia
Chestnut-sided warbler, Setophaga pensylvanica
Blackpoll warbler, Setophaga striata
Black-throated blue warbler, Setophaga caerulescens
Palm warbler, Setophaga palmarum
Pine warbler, Setophaga pinus
Yellow-rumped warbler, Setophaga coronata
Yellow-throated warbler, Setophaga dominica
Prairie warbler, Setophaga discolor
Black-throated gray warbler, Setophaga nigrescens (R)
Townsend's warbler, Setophaga townsendi (R)
Hermit warbler, Setophaga occidentalis (R)
Black-throated green warbler, Setophaga virens
Canada warbler, Cardellina canadensis
Wilson's warbler, Cardellina pusilla

Cardinals and allies

Order: PasseriformesFamily: Cardinalidae

The cardinals are a family of robust seed-eating birds with strong bills. They are typically associated with open woodland. The sexes usually have distinct plumages. Eleven species have been recorded in Maine.

Summer tanager, Piranga rubra
Scarlet tanager, Piranga olivacea 
Western tanager, Piranga ludoviciana
Northern cardinal, Cardinalis cardinalis 
Rose-breasted grosbeak, Pheucticus ludovicianus 
Black-headed grosbeak, Pheucticus melanocephalus (R)
Blue grosbeak, Passerina caerulea
Lazuli bunting, Passerina amoena (R)
Indigo bunting, Passerina cyanea 
Painted bunting, Passerina ciris
Dickcissel, Spiza americana

Notes

References

See also
List of birds of Acadia National Park
List of birds of Baxter State Park
List of birds
Lists of birds by region
List of North American birds

Birds
Maine